Jack the Bear is a 1993 American drama film directed by Marshall Herskovitz, written by Steven Zaillian based on the novel by Dan McCall, and starring Danny DeVito, Robert J. Steinmiller Jr., Miko Hughes, and Gary Sinise.

Plot
Jack Leary and his younger brother Dylan start over in Oakland, California, in 1972 following the death of their mother Elizabeth, who was killed in a car collision. The boys live with their father John, who entertains late-night horror film audiences as Midnight Shriek host-commentator "Al Gory." Even though he is a loving parent, John has a drinking problem that disrupts the smooth running of the household. Some parental duties fall to Jack, who takes Dylan to his first day of preschool.

One of the Learys' neighbors is a young man, Norman Strick, who walks with a cane due to a car accident as a teen. Norman is an anti-social neo-Nazi who feels the neighborhood is going downhill.

Jack has a love affair with his classmate Karen Morris. Jack's friend and next door neighbor, Dexter, comes from a broken home. Dexter resides with his grandparents; he begins suffering a downward spiral after his grandmother died while becoming acquainted with Norman. On Halloween, having given Dexter a Nazi costume, Norman approaches John to ask for a donation for a racially prejudiced candidate. During an airing of Invasion of the Body Snatchers, a drunken John interrupts the movie and mimics the racially charged beliefs of Norman while naming the candidate.

The next day, Jack is woken when Norman's golden retriever Cheyenne dies on their front lawn from poisoning. John apologizes for his actions on television while giving his condolences despite Norman refusing to shake his hand. Backlash from John's previous actions on his show jeopardizes his job and endangers Jack's relationship with Karen. Taking out his anger on Dylan and leaving him with Dexter, Jack learns that his brother was kidnapped by Norman.

Jack calls the police as he and John are extremely worried until Dylan is found alive in a nearby forest a few days later and taken to the hospital. He  has been traumatized by the ordeal of being left to die in the wilderness. The emotional trauma has rendered him mute.

Three days later, bringing Dylan home with Norman not seen for days, John begins getting agitated to the point of taking out his frustration at the Strick home with a bat, terrorizing the Stricks for their son's whereabouts before destroying Norman's beloved T-Bird. Fearing for his current state of mind, John lets his in-laws take the boys to their home in Los Angeles as he decides to shape up. Jack sneaks back to Oakland and falls asleep watching The Wolf Man. By the time John arrives home, Norman cuts the power as he sneaks into the house. Stirred awake by the outage, Jack is aware that someone intruded but accidentally knocks John out with a bat. Found by Norman, Jack runs upstairs and out the bathroom window to a branch of a nearby tree with Norman in pursuit as John regains consciousness. However, chased up to the higher point of the tree, Jack watches Norman losing his grip and falling into the backyard behind the Leary house where he is mauled to death by the neighbor's Doberman Pinschers. Soon after, as Norman's parents move away, Dylan returns home while John gets his job back with his show now airing more comical horror films like Abbott and Costello.

One afternoon, the neighborhood children all appear and ask if John will play one of his monster games with them as usual. After his experiences with Norman, John tells the children he won't play the monster game anymore. When they ask him why, John sees Dexter smoking a cigarette while realizing he's going down a dark path. John looks to the children that there are real monsters out there, but he promises to play a better game with them. Later finding Jack playing his mother's lullaby on the piano while getting Dylan to say the lullaby's title, John tries to comfort his son when he breaks down crying. As John gives Jack and himself closure, the two embrace Dylan after he says the title of Elizabeth's lullaby: "Jack the Bear." The next day, with their lives beginning to return to normal, John watches his sons playing in the front yard.

Cast

Reception
Reviews of the film were mixed to negative. Out of 18 reviews on Rotten Tomatoes, Jack the Bear carries a 28% 'rotten' rating.

Awards and nominations
1994 Young Artist Awards
 Won – Best Performance in a Feature Film - Supporting Actress: Reese Witherspoon
 Nominated – Best Performance in a Feature Film - Leading Actor: Robert J. Steinmiller Jr.
 Nominated – Best Performance in a Feature Film - Young Actor 10 or Younger: Miko Hughes

References

External links
 
 
 
 

1993 films
1993 drama films
20th Century Fox films
American drama films
Films directed by Marshall Herskovitz
Films scored by James Horner
Films about dysfunctional families
Films based on American novels
Films set in the 1970s
Films set in 1972
Films set in the San Francisco Bay Area
Films shot in San Francisco
Films with screenplays by Steven Zaillian
Films about father–son relationships
Films about brothers
1993 directorial debut films
1990s English-language films
1990s American films
English-language drama films